Choristoneura freemani, the western spruce budworm, is a species of moth of the family Tortricidae. It is the most destructive defoliator of coniferous forests in western North America.

Distribution
It is now widely distributed throughout the Rocky and Coast Mountains. The first recorded outbreak was in 1909 on the southeastern part of Vancouver Island in British Columbia, Canada. Since that year, infestations have frequently been reported in western Canada.

The budworm was first recorded in 1914 in the United States, in Oregon. However, it was not initially recognized as a serious threat to coniferous forests in the western U.S. Aerial spraying apparently terminated some smaller epidemics in the southern and central Rockies; others subsided naturally. The insect then appeared to be dormant in US forests until 1922, when two outbreaks were reported near Priest Lake in northern Idaho. Since then, significant outbreaks in the Rockies and in the Pacific Northwest have caused top-killing and serious economic losses in tree growth. Tree mortality from budworm can occur in regeneration, sapling, and pole-sized trees. Trees in mature stands severely defoliated by the western spruce budworm may become susceptible to bark beetles, which kill mature trees.

Impact
From 1970 -2001 further outbreaks occurred over a much larger area including the area of the previous outbreaks, as well as the Thompson and South Okanagan areas in 1970-2001.

There is no typical pattern for western spruce budworm epidemics. Most of the early epidemics subsided naturally after a few years. Others persisted longer, but without spreading over large areas.

Description

Adult moths are about 1/2 inch (12.7 mm) long and have a wing-spread of 7/8 to 11/8 inches (22 to 28mm). Moths of both sexes are similar in appearance, although the females are a bit more robust than males. Both sexes fly. The gray- or orange-brown forewings are banded or streaked, and each usually has a conspicuous white dot on the wing margin. Eggs are oval, light green, and about 3/64 inch (1.2mm) long and overlap like shingles.

Larvae develop through six stages. Newly hatched larvae are yellow-green with brown heads. In the next three stages, larvae have black heads and collars and orange- or cinnamon-brown bodies. In the fifth stage, larvae have reddish-brown heads marked with black triangles, black collars, and pale olive-brown bodies marked with small whitish spots. Mature larvae are 1 to 11/4 inches (25 to 32 mm) long, with tan or light chestnut-brown heads and collars and olive- or reddish-brown bodies with large ivory-colored areas.

Pupae are 1/2 to 5/8 inch (13 to 16 mm) long, broad at the head end, and narrower toward the tail. They are brownish yellow or brownish green at first, and later turn reddish brown.

Life cycle
Throughout most of its range, the western spruce budworm completes one cycle of development from egg to adult within 12 months. Moths emerge from pupal cases usually in late July or early August; in the southern Rockies, adults often begin emerging in early July.

The adults mate, and within 7 to 10 days, the female deposits her eggs and then dies. Each female deposits approximately 150 eggs, usually on the underside of conifer needles. Eggs are laid in one to three-row masses containing a few to 130 eggs, with an average of 25 to 40 eggs per mass.

Larvae hatch from eggs in about 10 days. Larvae do not feed, but seek sheltered places under bark scales or in and among lichens on the tree bole or limbs. Here, they spin silken tents in which they remain inactive through the winter.

In early May to late June, larvae leave their hibernacula to search for food. They first mine or tunnel into year-old needles, closed buds, or newly developing vegetative or reproductive buds.

New foliage, which is normally the preferred food, is usually entirely consumed or destroyed before larvae will feed on older needles. Larvae become full grown usually in early July about 30 to 40 days after leaving their overwintering sites.

Larvae pupate in webs of silk they have spun either at the last feeding site or elsewhere on the tree. The pupal stage usually lasts about 10 days.

Taxonomy
The species was originally named Choristoneura occidentalis by Freeman. However, this name was already in use for an African species described by Walsingham. The replacement name for this North American species is Choristoneura freemani.

References

Moths described in 2008
Moths described in 1967
Choristoneura